Gary Robert Habermas (born 1950) is an American New Testament scholar and theologian who frequently writes and lectures on the resurrection of Jesus. He has specialized in cataloging and communicating trends among scholars in the field of historical Jesus and New Testament studies. He is distinguished research professor and chair of the department of philosophy and theology at Liberty University.

Life and career
Habermas is a Distinguished Research Professor of Apologetics and Philosophy and chairman of the department of philosophy at Liberty University in Lynchburg, Virginia. He received his Doctor of Philosophy degree from Michigan State University in 1976; his thesis was titled "The resurrection of Jesus: a rational inquiry". Habermas previously acquired a master's degree (1973) from the University of Detroit in philosophical theology. He has specialized in cataloging and communicating trends among scholars who study topics pertaining to the historical Jesus and New Testament studies.

In his memoir Seeking Allah, Finding Jesus, Nabeel Qureshi relates how Habermas was influential in his conversion, and describes him as looking like "a mix between Santa Claus and an offensive lineman".

Works

Books

Edited by

References

External links
 Official website
 Gary Habermas on Theopedia
 

1950 births
Living people
21st-century American male writers
21st-century American non-fiction writers
21st-century American theologians
21st-century evangelicals
American biblical scholars
American evangelicals
American male non-fiction writers
American philosophers
Christian apologists
Christian philosophers
Critics of the Christ myth theory
Evangelical theologians
Evangelical writers
Liberty University faculty
Michigan State University alumni
New Testament scholars
Philosophers of religion
Researchers of the Shroud of Turin
University of Detroit Mercy alumni